Tahina also known as Tahini is a condiment made from sesame.

It may also refer to:

Tahina, Iran, a village in Iran also known as Tahuneh, Jahrom, Iran
Tahina spectabilis, species of gigantic palm tree found in northeastern Madagascar
Tahina Razafindramary, educationist and teacher from Madagascar

See also
Tajine, a North African dish